The Sanghir squirrel (Prosciurillus rosenbergii) is a species of rodent in the family Sciuridae. It is endemic to the volcanic Sangir Islands (where they are the only squirrel) in Indonesia, located just north of the equator in the Celebes Sea, between the Indonesian island of Sulawesi and the island of Mindanao in the Philippines.

Habitat
This tropical tree squirrel is the most abundant mammal on heavily cultivated Sangir, where it is found throughout the various ecosystems of the island (including towns and farms), but is especially concentrated in the dwindling old-growth lowland tropical rainforest. In spite of this environmental diversity, the Sanghir squirrel has adapted itself to each of these climatic zones.

References

Prosciurillus
Rodents of Sulawesi
Mammals of Indonesia
Mammals described in 1879